Dickons is a surname. Notable people with the surname include:

 Maria Dickons (1770s–1833), British opera singer

See also
 Dickens (surname)
 Dickon

English-language surnames